Abstract object theory (AOT) is a branch of metaphysics regarding abstract objects. Originally devised by metaphysician Edward Zalta in 1981, the theory was an expansion of mathematical Platonism.

Overview

Abstract Objects: An Introduction to Axiomatic Metaphysics (1983) is the title of a publication by Edward Zalta that outlines abstract object theory.

AOT is a dual predication approach (also known as "dual copula strategy") to abstract objects influenced by the contributions of Alexius Meinong and his student Ernst Mally. On Zalta's account, there are two modes of predication: some objects (the ordinary concrete ones around us, like tables and chairs) exemplify properties, while others (abstract objects like numbers, and what others would call "non-existent objects", like the round square, and the mountain made entirely of gold) merely encode them. While the objects that exemplify properties are discovered through traditional empirical means, a simple set of axioms allows us to know about objects that encode properties. For every set of properties, there is exactly one object that encodes exactly that set of properties and no others. This allows for a formalized ontology.

A notable feature of AOT is that several notable paradoxes in naive predication theory (namely Romane Clark's paradox undermining the earliest version of Héctor-Neri Castañeda's guise theory, Alan McMichael's paradox, and Daniel Kirchner's paradox) do not arise within it. AOT employs restricted abstraction schemata to avoid such paradoxes.

In 2007, Zalta and Branden Fitelson introduced the term computational metaphysics to describe the implementation and investigation of formal, axiomatic metaphysics in an automated reasoning environment.

See also

 Abstract and concrete
 Abstractionism (philosophy of mathematics)
 Algebra of concepts
 Mathematical universe hypothesis
 Modal Meinongianism
 Modal neo-logicism
 Object of the mind

Notes

References
 Edward N. Zalta, Abstract Objects: An Introduction to Axiomatic Metaphysics, Dordrecht: D. Reidel, 1983.
 Edward N. Zalta, Intensional Logic and the Metaphysics of Intentionality, Cambridge, MA: The MIT Press/Bradford Books, 1988.
 Edward N. Zalta, Principia Metaphysica, Center for the Study of Language and Information, Stanford University, February 10, 1999.
 Daniel Kirchner, Christoph Benzmüller, Edward N. Zalta, "Mechanizing Principia Logico-Metaphysica in Functional Type Theory", Review of Symbolic Logic 13(1) (March 2020): 206–18.
 Edward N. Zalta, Principia Logico-Metaphysica, Center for the Study of Language and Information, Stanford University, September 6, 2022.

Further reading
 Daniel Kirchner, Computer-Verified Foundations of Metaphysics and an Ontology of Natural Numbers in Isabelle/HOL, PhD thesis, Free University of Berlin, 2021.
 Edward N. Zalta, "Typed Object Theory", in José L. Falguera and Concha Martínez-Vidal (eds.), Abstract Objects: For and Against, Springer (Synthese Library), 2020.

 
Abstraction
Metaphysical theories
Platonism
Reality